The Downtown YMCA is a historic YMCA building in Downtown Columbus, Ohio. It is the largest YMCA resident facility in the United States. It was listed on the National Register of Historic Places in 1993. The seven-story building was designed in the Jacobethan Revival and Late Gothic Revival styles by Walter F. Shattuck.

History 

The YMCA was first established in Columbus in 1855, reorganized in 1875, and moved locations numerous times. One of these locations was at 34 S. 3rd St., a Yost & Packard building, now the site of the Columbus Dispatch Building.

The organization purchased the lot for the current YMCA in 1916, with delayed construction due to World War I. The building was constructed in 1923 and dedicated in 1924. The building hosted the first evening high school which evolved to include post-secondary and professional programs to become Franklin University.

In 1995, the building's title was transferred to the Columbus City Council to help a $19 million restoration of the building qualify for a 30-year exemption on real estate taxes. The project included adding 50 units and renovating the existing 350 apartments and mechanicals. The renovations began in 1997.

In 2019, after years of studying potential renovations, the 403-unit building is set to close in three to seven years, as the YMCA moves its residents to newer facilities. The  building has a market value of $5.6 million, and would require $50–60 million in renovation, not affordable as it is close to the Columbus YMCA's entire annual budget. The organization plans to lease out a facility and redistribute residents to existing facilities, and to build a new full-service downtown facility for its 3,400 YMCA members in the next five to ten years. The YMCA is confident the building can be repurposed, having talked to 8-10 developers, with none who have toured having proposed demolishing it.

In August 2022, YMCA of Central Ohio and the Columbus Downtown Development Corporation (CDDC) began working on a deal for the CDDC to take over ownership of the building by January 2023. Several dozen current residents of the building will be moved to new housing for low-income seniors operated by the Columbus Metropolitan Housing Authority  in Franklinton.

See also
 National Register of Historic Places listings in Columbus, Ohio

References

External links

Official website 

Buildings in downtown Columbus, Ohio
Commercial buildings completed in 1924
Commercial buildings on the National Register of Historic Places in Ohio
National Register of Historic Places in Columbus, Ohio
YMCA buildings in the United States